Nancy Davis (born ) is an American entrepreneur who founded, served as Chief investment officer, and as managing partner of Quadratic Capital Management.

Life 
Davis was born . She grew up in Tampa, Florida, and obtained a B.A. in economics from George Washington University.

After graduating, she began her career at Goldman Sachs where she spent more than ten years, the last seven with the proprietary trading group where she rose to the Head of Credit, Derivatives and OTC Trading. She served as a portfolio manager at Highbridge Capital Management and also took a senior executive role at AllianceBernstein.

She is the founder, Chief investment officer, and managing partner of Quadratic Capital Management. The firm is based in Greenwich, Connecticut. Its IVOL fund was judged by ETF.com to be the best new fixed-income ETF of 2019.

References 

1970s births
Living people
George Washington University School of Business alumni
American hedge fund managers
21st-century American businesswomen
21st-century American businesspeople
American women investors
Goldman Sachs people
Chief investment officers
American women company founders
Businesspeople from Tampa, Florida